Michaël Tronche (born August 7, 1978) is a footballer. He currently plays for Trélissac FC as a defensive midfielder.

See also
Football in France
List of football clubs in France

References

External links
Michaël Tronche profile at chamoisfc79.fr

1978 births
Living people
French footballers
Association football midfielders
Angoulême Charente FC players
Chamois Niortais F.C. players
Stade Brestois 29 players
Ligue 2 players
SO Châtellerault players
Trélissac FC players
AS Moulins players
Sportspeople from Clermont-Ferrand
Footballers from Auvergne-Rhône-Alpes